The Journal of Management Education is a bimonthly peer-reviewed academic journal that covers the teaching and learning of management. The editors-in-chief are Jeanie M. Forray (Western New England University) and Kathy Lund Dean (Gustavus Adolphus College). It was established in 1975 and is  published by SAGE Publications in association with the Management & Organizational Behavior Teaching Society.

Abstracting and indexing 
The journal is abstracted and indexed in:
 Academic Search
 Emerald Management Reviews
 FRANCIS
 PsycINFO

External links 
 
 Organizational Behavior Teaching Society

SAGE Publishing academic journals
English-language journals
Business and management journals
Bimonthly journals
Publications established in 1975